

The Philadelphia and Reading Railroad, Schuylkill River Viaduct, also called the Reading Railroad Bridge and the Falls Rail Bridge, is a stone arch bridge that carries rail traffic over the Schuylkill River at Falls of Schuylkill (East Falls) in Philadelphia, Pennsylvania. Located in Fairmount Park, the bridge also spans Martin Luther King, Jr., Drive, and Kelly Drive. The name Philadelphia & Reading Railroad (P&R) was later shortened to Reading Company.

The current bridge replaced an adjacent P&R bridge, built of wood. Prior to that, one of the earliest suspension bridges in the United States, the 1808 Chain Bridge at Falls of Schuylkill (collapsed 1816), was built at this location. That was replaced by an 1818 covered bridge, built on the chain bridge's abutments, which washed away in 1822.

The P&R built the viaduct, 1853–56, to carry coal cars to the company's coal terminal on the Delaware River in the Port Richmond neighborhood of Philadelphia.

The bridge's design is unusual. Because it crosses the river at an oblique angle, it was constructed as a ribbed skew arch bridge, with each span composed of a series of offset stone arches. While not as strong as skewed barrel vault spans, these spans were much easier to build, while still assuring that the bridge's abutments were parallel to the water flow.

The bridge consists of six main spans, each  in length, crossing the river and Kelly Drive; five small arches, each  in length, for pedestrian traffic; and a  arch over Martin Luther King, Jr., Drive. The bridge's spandrel walls were reinforced in 1935. The bridge continues to carry rail traffic to this day.

Gallery

See also

List of bridges documented by the Historic American Engineering Record in Pennsylvania
List of crossings of the Schuylkill River
Chain Bridge at Falls of Schuylkill

Notes

References

External links

Listing at Philadelphia Architects and Buildings

Bridges in Philadelphia
Bridges over the Schuylkill River
Skew bridges
Reading Railroad bridges
Bridges completed in 1856
Railroad bridges in Pennsylvania
Historic American Engineering Record in Philadelphia
Viaducts in the United States
Stone arch bridges in the United States